Dompierre-sur-Chalaronne (literally Dompierre on Chalaronne) is a commune in the Ain department in eastern France.

Geography
The Chalaronne flows west-northwest through the southern part of the commune.

Population

See also
Communes of the Ain department
Dombes

References

External links

 La Dombes and Dompierre-sur-Chalaronne

Communes of Ain
Ain communes articles needing translation from French Wikipedia
Bresse